Noqteh Bandi (also Romanized as Noqţeh Bandī; also known as Nuktaband, and Nuqtāband) is a village in Bonab Rural District, in the Central District of Zanjan County, Zanjan Province, Iran. At the 2006 census, its population was 102, in 22 families.

References 

Populated places in Zanjan County